"Follow Through" is a single by Gavin DeGraw released in 2005. It is featured on his 2003 album, Chariot. The song has been featured on several television shows, including One Tree Hill and Scrubs and, from 2008 to 2010, played in the UK and Italian advertisements for Carte D'or.

Track listing
"Follow Through" (album version)
"I Don't Want to Be" (live at the Scala)
"Follow Through" (Stripped version)
"Follow Through" (video)

Charts

Weekly charts

Year-end charts

Certifications

References

2005 singles
Gavin DeGraw songs
Rock ballads
Songs written by Gavin DeGraw
2003 songs